The Documentation Center Nazi Party Rallying Grounds (German: Dokumentationszentrum Reichsparteitagsgelände) is a museum in Nuremberg. It is in the north wing of the unfinished remains of the Congress Hall of the former Nazi party rallies. Its permanent exhibition "Fascination and Terror" is concerned with the causes, connections, and consequences of Nazi Germany. Topics that have a direct reference to Nuremberg are especially taken into account. Attached to the museum is an education forum.

Architecture 
In 1994 the city council of Nuremberg decided to establish the Documentation Center. Austrian architect Günther Domenig designed the museum, winning the 1998 international competition with his proposal to spear through the northern head of the building with a diagonal glass and steel passageway. This is where Speer had created the "cathedral of light" and where the Nazis drew nearly a million people in rallies between 1933 and 1938. These were captured on film by Leni Riefenstahl in Triumph of the Will. Domenig, the son of a Nazi judge, confronted his own personal history in addition to the history and Nazi architecture of the project's site. On 4 November 2001 the project was unveiled by Johannes Rau, then President of Germany.

Exhibition 
The permanent exhibition "Fascination and Terror" (Faszination und Gewalt) studies the causes, coherence, and consequences of National Socialism. It describes the Nazi Party Rallies and explains the fascination they exercised upon participants and visitors. At the same time, the exhibition endeavors to explain what led to the National Socialists' criminal exercise of power and to reveal how the various causal factors were interrelated. A further goal is a frank presentation of the violent consequences that ensued for the population. The events that are inseparably linked with Nuremberg ("city of the party rally" — Stadt der Reichsparteitage) and the National Socialist period are also explained: the activities of Julius Streicher, editor of the anti-Semitic rabble-rousing weekly Der Stürmer (The Storm Trooper), the history of the Nuremberg Rally, the proclamation of the so-called Nuremberg Laws in 1935, the buildings of the Nazi party rally grounds and the trouble with Nazi architecture after 1945, and the criminal Nuremberg Trials against the chief executives of the National Socialist agenda in 1945–1946 and twelve succeeding trials. The exhibition concludes with an examination of the problem that has been with Germany since 1945: how Germans should deal with the legacy in stone left at the Party Rally Grounds by the National Socialists.

The exhibition is structured in chronological order. The individual exhibition rooms vary in size and structure. They range from corridors of just a few square meters in size to large halls. The exhibition area offers a total of 1,300 square meters of floor space.

The exhibition is presented in narrative form. Use is made of classical exhibition methods as well as of modern forms of presentation. Five films newly created for the Documentation Center are essential elements on the route through the exhibition. Easy-to-use electronic display stations on various topics offer a wealth of informative pictorial material. Eyewitness interviews which were especially filmed are aimed at making history much more amenable, particularly for the younger generation. A wearable "Audioguide" leads visitors through the exhibition in English, French, Italian, Spanish, Russian, and Polish.

Education forum 
The attached education forum is in the glazed cube on the roof of the congress hall. A union of seven Nuremberg educational institutions under the management of the museen der stadt nürnberg makes possible an extensive and target group oriented program. The offer extends from 45 minute exhibition tours to several day seminars aimed at school classes for both youth and adult groups. The content includes such topics as "the power of images", "youth between adaptation and resistance", and "the system of concentration camps."

The partners of the education center are:

 Geschichte Für Alle e.V. – Institut für Regionalgeschichte
 Jugendakademie im Caritas-Pirckheimer-Haus
 Jugendzentrum für kulturelle und politische Bildung der Stadt Nürnberg
 Jugendring/Kreisjugendring Nürnberg-Stadt
 Kunst -und Kulturpädagogisches Zentrum der Museen in Nürnberg
 Menschenrechtsbüro der Stadt Nürnberg
 Nürnberger Menschenrechtszentrum e.V.

Awards 
In 2001, the Innovation-prize of the Nuremberg region was awarded to the partners of the Documentation Center in the education forum.

In 2002, the British Guild of Travel Writers awarded the Documentation Center with an award for Best New Overseas Tourism Project.

In 2004, Günther Domenig was honored by the 9th International Architecture Exhibition of the Venice Biennale in their section "Transformations." The citation remarked on the opposition of the geometry between the project by Domenig versus the existing structure, and the resulting creation of a profound memorial.

Information system 
Since May 2006, the exhibition in the Documentation Center has been supplemented by an information system with 23 stele in the grounds, that make possible an individual tour of the former Nazi Party Rallying Grounds.

References

Literature

Video
"Ruins of the Reich R.J. Adams DVD (Then & Now documentary exploration of the NSDAP party grounds)

External links 

  
 The Information System at the Nazi Party Rally Grounds

Nazi architecture
History museums in Germany
Museums in Nuremberg
World War II museums in Germany